Datuk Seri Zulkifli Noordin (born 19 February 1962) is a Malaysian politician and a former Member of the Parliament of Malaysia for the Kulim–Bandar Baharu constituency in Kedah. He held the seat as an Independent, although having been elected on the ticket and as a member of the People's Justice Party (PKR) but was sacked in 2010. Zulkifli was also the deputy president of right-wing Malay organisation, Perkasa.

Zulkifli was elected to the Parliament in the 2008 election. His election had been contested by the defeated UMNO candidate; however the court petition to overturn the result was eventually withdrawn. In the 2013 election, he contested the Shah Alam parliamentary seat under the Barisan Nasional ticket and was defeated.

Zulkifli is also a Sharia lawyer.

Controversies

Allah issue
Datuk Zulkifli Nordin was a public figure in the controversy over the use of the word 'Allah' in a Catholic publication. In response to the decision of the High Court allowing the publication Herald, Zulkifli stated "I can't understand how any Muslim can support this judgment". Zulkifli also called for the resignation of a Pan-Malaysian Islamic Party MP, Khalid Samad for supporting the right of Christians to use the word 'Allah'.

Dismissal from PKR
On 6 March 2010, Zulkifli was dismissed from PKR following the unanimous decision of a party disciplinary panel arising from Zulkifli's lodging of a police report against Khalid Samad and his public criticisms of the Chief Minister of Penang, Lim Guan Eng. Zulkifli's request to have his case heard by an all-Muslim disciplinary panel had been dismissed by the party. He immediately indicated he would remain in Parliament as an Independent. He has been vocal in criticising the federal opposition, especially the PKR, since his dismissal.

Insulting remarks against Hindus
In March 2013, Zulkifli Noordin has been heavily criticised by several Hindu politicians after giving a religious sermon belittling Hinduism. A YouTube video of the speech has been circulating on social media. In his speech, he explained how he laughed at the Indian traders on why the Hindu gods could not prevent the trader's shop from being flooded. He also questioned the purity and holiness of the Ganges River, India, which is considered sacred by the Hindus, claiming that the Ganges River is filled with chicken carcasses and twigs floating. Besides that, Zulkifli also mocked the Hindu god Lord Ganesha, by questioning why the Hindus are fighting over buying the deity's statue with the trunk broken. He also questioned the holiness of the Hindu gods when he said when the broken parts of the statue can just be mended by plaster.

The video clip has sparked outrage among many people from the Malaysian Hindu community. PKR vice-president and lawyer N. Surendran wants Zulkifli to be charged with Section 298A of the Penal Code for uttering words which causes disharmony, feelings of enmity, hatred or ill-will on grounds of religion. He added that Zulkifli is a close ally with Malaysian Prime Minister Datuk Seri Najib Razak, in which he described that UMNO and Barisan Nasional must take responsibility for the sacrilegious remarks and mockery of Hinduism.

MIC central working committee member Datuk T. Rajagopalu told Zulkifli to 'shut up' and apologise for his insensitive remarks against the Hindus. He added that Zulkifli is unfit to be an MP, describing the lawyer as a half-baked lawyer and not a true Muslim man. MIC vice-president Datuk S.K. Devamany also demanded that Zulkifli apologise and withdraw his remarks.  Aside from them, MIC central working committee member P. Kamalanathan condemned Zulkifli's remarks "in the harshest manner possible." Human rights group SUARAM also rebuked Zulkifli and urged voters to reject him in the upcoming Malaysian 13th general elections. Hindu Sangam chief said that no legal action were taken against Zulkifli because he is a Muslim and vice-president of Perkasa.

Zulkifli later apologised on 1 April 2013 for hurting the feelings of the Indian community. This change of sentiment was most probably due to the upcoming 13th general election.

Zulkifli Nordin also states that his statement was made during his days in PAS and he was remorseful for his actions. He also added he had made a lot of mistakes during his tenure as a PAS member and also as a lawyer for Anwar Ibrahim. One of those mistake is the remarks he made to the Hindu community in Malaysia. The video resurfaced only recently after he was ousted by the Pakatan Rakyat and now he is facing attacks from his former colleague even though no PAS members made any statements during Zulkifli Nordin's tenure as a representative from PAS.

Insensitive remarks on the passing of Karpal Singh
On 17 April 2014, Zulkifli Noordin commented that Allah had killed off Karpal had received swift criticisms from Barisan Nasional and Opposition MPs.

Election results

Honours
  :
  Knight Companion of the Order of the Crown of Pahang (DIMP) – Dato' (2010)
  :
  Grand Commander of the Order of the Territorial Crown (SMW) – Datuk Seri (2016)

References

Malaysian people of Malay descent
Malaysian Muslims
Living people
1962 births

20th-century Malaysian lawyers

People from Kedah
Members of the Dewan Rakyat
United Malays National Organisation politicians
Former People's Justice Party (Malaysia) politicians
Former Malaysian Islamic Party politicians
Independent politicians in Malaysia
21st-century Malaysian politicians
Sharia lawyers